The Bobo is a 1967 British comedy film directed by Robert Parrish and starring Peter Sellers and Britt Ekland. The screenplay is based on the 1959 novel Olimpia by Burt Cole, also known as Thomas Dixon.

Plot 

Singing matador Juan Bautista is offered a break by a theater manager if he will seduce the beautiful Olimpia.

Cast 
 Peter Sellers as Juan Bautista
 Britt Ekland as Olimpia Segura
 Rossano Brazzi as Carlos Matabosch
 Adolfo Celi as Francisco Carbonell
 Hattie Jacques as Trinity Martinez
 Ferdy Mayne as Silvestre Flores
 Kenneth Griffith as Pepe Gamazo
 Al Lettieri as Eugenio Gomez
 Marne Maitland as Luis Castillo
 John Wells as Pompadour Major Domo
 Don Lurio as Ramon Gonzales
 Antonia Santiago Amador (La Chana) as flamenco dancer

Production

Original novel and play 
The film was based on the novel Olimpia by Burt Cole, published in 1959. The New York Times wrote that "the author does have an ability to see with imagination and occasionally literary artistry. What he lacks ... is not flamboyance, but a story with substance."

In 1961 it was announced that David R. Schwartz had written a theatre adaptation titled The Bobo, with former Moss Hart assistant Joseph Hyman slated to produce, Norman Jewison to direct and Diane Cilento and Shelley Berman to star. Jewison said: "It's not a slick comedy. It's a little different and much fresher." In 1962, Caroline Swan was named as producer, but the play never materialized.

Development 
In August 1962, George Cukor announced that he would produce a film based on the book to star Ava Gardner.

In May 1966, it was announced that film rights to the play were owned by the team of Eliot Kastner and Jerry Gershwin, who had recently produced Harper and Kaleidescope for Warner Bros. They signed a deal with Peter Sellers to star in the film and possibly direct it. In August 1966, it was announced that Sellers' wife Britt Ekland would appear in the film as the first of a five-film contract with Gershwin. Eventually, Sellers decided not to direct and Robert Parrish took the job.

Shooting 
Filming took place in Italy and Barcelona in August 1966 and at Cinecittà Studios, Rome. It was a difficult shoot, as Sellers and Ekland were having marital problems and Sellers' mother died during filming. Sellers insisted on directing some of the film.

Soundtrack 
"Imagine," the song heard with the titles, was written by Francis Lai, with lyrics by Sammy Cahn. It was released as a single by Stan Kenton and His Orchestra, by Dana Valery as a B-side to "You" and by John Gary as a B-side to "Cold", all in 1967.

Reception 
In a contemporary review for The New York Times, critic Bosley Crowther wrote: "[A]fter sitting dutifully through it, I can tell you what a bobo is. It's a booboo—and that goes not only for the title character, played by a strangely lackluster Mr. Sellers, but also for the film. It's amazing how labored and unfunny is the screenplay of this pseudocomic tale."

Richard Schickel wrote in Time: "There comes a time in the life of every screen comedian when he urgently feels the need to have the adjective 'Chaplinesque' applied to his work. It is a dangerous moment, with the pitfall of pretentiousness yawning on one side, sentimentality on the other and all the psychological hazards of overreaching buzzing in the back of the mind. It is a pleasure to report that Peter Sellers—that excellent fellow—has not only endured this trial, but has mostly prevailed over it."

References

External links 
 
 
 
 

1967 films
1967 romantic comedy films
British romantic comedy films
Films scored by Francis Lai
Films produced by Elliott Kastner
Films set in Barcelona
Films shot at Cinecittà Studios
Films directed by Robert Parrish
1960s English-language films
1960s British films